Filipendula palmata   is a species of plant in the family Rosaceae that is native to China.

References

External links
 
 

palmata
Plants described in 1879